Procacci is an Italian surname. Notable people with the surname include:

 Domenico Procacci (born 1960), Italian film producer
 Giovanni Procacci (born 1955), Italian politician
 Vincenza Procacci (born 1966), American tennis player

Italian-language surnames